Verfrut Airport is an airstrip  south-southeast of San Pedro, a town in the Santiago Metropolitan Region of Chile.

The airstrip runs alongside a highway. There is rising terrain west and southwest.

See also

Transport in Chile
List of airports in Chile

References

External links
OpenStreetMap - Verfrut Airport
OurAirports - Verfrut Airport
FallingRain - Verfrut Airport

Airports in Chile
Airports in Santiago Metropolitan Region